Fucked by My Best Friend, known in Japan as , is a romantic comedy manga series created by Yupopo Orishima. It has been serialized in Japanese by Screamo since October 4, 2019, and is published in English by Coolmic; it is also released in collected tankōbon volumes in Japanese by Suiseisha.

The series follows two womanizing playboys, one of whom is drugged to be taught a lesson, which transforms his body to look like a woman's; following this, his friend falls in love with him. An anime television series adaptation directed by Chokkō at Irawiazu premiered on April 5 to May 24, 2021.

Synopsis
Fucked by My Best Friend is a gay romantic comedy manga, which follows Shion Chihara and Rui Chihaya, two close friends and pickup artists. To teach him a lesson about his womanizing ways, a woman drugs Shion, which alters his body to look like a woman's. Rui does at first not recognize Shion, and falls in love with him at first sight.

Characters
 , a womanizing playboy, and a close friend of Rui's. After being drugged, his body changes to look like a woman's. 
 , a womanizing playboy, and a close friend of Shion's. 
 , a doctor knowledgeable on the human body, and an acquaintance of Rui's. 
 , a beauty contest winner who is attracted to Rui.

Production and release
Fucked by My Best Friend is written and drawn by Yupopo Orishima, and is released digitally by Screamo under their imprint Zettai Ryōiki R! since October 4, 2019. It has also been released in print in collected tankōbon volumes by Suiseisha under their Glanz BL Comics imprint since July 18, 2020. An English translation is published digitally by Coolmic through their website.

Volumes

Anime
The animation studio Irawiazu is adapting the manga into an eight-episode series of anime shorts under the title . It is directed by Chokkō, with a script by Rei Ishikura and Eeyo Kurosaki, and art direction by Namiko Hanayashiki and Tamako Noyama. McQ1 designed the characters, and is also chief animation director for the project.

The series aired from April 5 to May 24, 2021, and is released in two versions: one "premium edition" featuring sex scenes, available through the ComicFesta anime streaming service, and one "on-air edition" without the sex scenes, airing on Japanese television on Tokyo MX and BS11; the first episode of the on-air edition was released for free ahead of the full release through YouTube and ComicFesta on February 11, 2021. The on-air version is planned to be released on DVD in Japan on July 28, 2021.

Episodes

Notes

References

External links
  
 

Josei manga
LGBT in anime and manga
Romantic comedy anime and manga
Tokyo MX original programming
Yaoi anime and manga